Her Private Affair is a 1929 American drama film directed by Paul L. Stein and starring Ann Harding, Harry Bannister and John Loder. It was produced and distributed by the Pathé Exchange company. A silent film with sound effects and talking sequences.

Cast
Ann Harding as Vera Kessler
Harry Bannister as Judge Richard Kessler
John Loder as Carl Wield
Kay Hammond as Julia Sturm
Arthur Hoyt as Michael Sturm
William Orlamond as Dr. Edmond Zeigler
Lawford Davidson as Arnold Hartmann
Elmer Ballard as Grimm
Frank Reicher as State's Attorney

References

External links

Her Private Affair available for free download at Internet Archive

1929 films
Films directed by Paul L. Stein
American films based on plays
Pathé Exchange films
American drama films
1929 drama films
American black-and-white films
1920s American films
Films with screenplays by Francis Edward Faragoh
1920s English-language films
English-language drama films